Shivaji Mane was a member of the 11th Lok Sabha & 13th Lok Sabha of India. He represented the Hingoli constituency of Maharashtra as Shiv Sena candidate. Currently, Mane is a member of the Nationalist Congress Party political party.

References

India MPs 1996–1997
India MPs 1999–2004
Living people
Marathi politicians
Shiv Sena politicians
Indian National Congress politicians
Nationalist Congress Party politicians from Maharashtra
Lok Sabha members from Maharashtra
People from Hingoli
Year of birth missing (living people)